The COVID-19 pandemic is an ongoing viral pandemic of coronavirus disease 2019 (COVID-19), a novel infectious disease caused by severe acute respiratory syndrome coronavirus 2 (SARS-CoV-2). This pandemic has affected the Regional Municipality of York since early 2020 and has led to lockdowns as well as stay-at-home orders made by the Government of Ontario. A vaccination program began in December 2020 and is currently ongoing.

Background 

On March 18, 2020, the municipalities of Aurora and Newmarket declared an emergency due to increasing community spread of COVID-19. By the next week, the provincial government declared an emergency and imposed immediate public health measures.

Timeline

February 2020
February 25 – a woman from Iran returning to York Region tests positive for COVID-19. This was the first case reported in York Region.

March 2020 
March 23 – the provincial government orders all non-essential businesses (e.g. restaurants, mall retail) to close. Gathering limits are introduced. Due to the hardship imposed on businesses, subsidies and financial relief measures were introduced.

April 2020
April 10 – an outbreak at Participation House, a care home takes place. Participation House is a care home for adults with developmental disabilities.

May 2020

Government response

Transit

As a result of the COVID-19 pandemic leading to a lockdown, York Region Transit reduced service. School routes were cancelled. To reduce contact between the driver and passengers, boarding was done at the back door  and fares were not collected until July 2, 2020, when front-door boarding resumed.

Impacts

Business closures and cancellations 
COVID-19 has led to shutdowns of non-essential businesses in York Region, such as restaurants, movie theatres and gyms. This happened at the beginning of the pandemic in March 2020. By July 2020, non-essential businesses were permitted to open in stage 3, but were closed again on October 19, 2020.

Schools 
At the beginning of the pandemic in 2020, COVID-19 forced schools in York Region to close for the rest of the academic year.

See also
 COVID-19 pandemic in Canada
 COVID-19 pandemic in Ontario
 COVID-19 pandemic in Ottawa
 COVID-19 pandemic in the Regional Municipality of Peel
 COVID-19 pandemic in Toronto

References

External links
 

COVID-19 pandemic in Canada by city
Health in Ontario
York
York
York
York
York
Regional Municipality of York